Aeriel Alease Skinner (born December 20, 1994) is an American sport shooter.

She participated at the 2018 ISSF World Shooting Championships, winning a medal.

References

External links

Living people
1994 births
American female sport shooters
Trap and double trap shooters
People from Lodi, California
21st-century American women